Syed Adeebul Hasan Rizvi (also spelled: Adibul Hasan Rizvi) is a Pakistani philanthropist, doctor, Renal transplant surgeon and founder of the Sindh Institute of Urology and Transplantation (SIUT), the largest kidney transplant centre in Pakistan. This institute is affiliated with the nearby Civil Hospital, Karachi.

Early life and career
Rizvi was born on 11 September 1938 in a small village Kalanpur in Jaunpur district, Uttar Pradesh, British India. He graduated from Dow Medical College in Karachi, Pakistan in 1968. Thereafter he went to UK to pursue his postgraduate training. After finishing his studies there, he returned to Pakistan. "In those days most people returned from the UK with cars, but guess what, Dr. Rizvi returned with a container full of medical equipment".

While living in the UK, Rizvi was inspired by the National Health Service and decided to try that idea in Pakistan. Rizvi set up an eight-bed urology ward at the Civil Hospital, Karachi in 1970.

SIUT started as an eight-bed ward at Civil Hospital, Karachi, and has grown to be Pakistan's leading & largest Urology and Transplantation Institute with branches (satellite centers) spreading from Kathore near Karachi to far North in Azad Kashmir.

Rizvi is the president of the Transplant Society of Pakistan. In 2003, Rizvi led a team of SIUT surgeons that performed the first successful liver transplant on an infant in Pakistan.

In 2001, police arrested "a gang that was planning to murder" Rizvi.

Awards and recognition
 Ramon Magsaysay Award in 1998
 WHO's Shousha Prize in 2008
 Lifetime Achievement Award by The Sindh Association of North America in 2015
 Nishan-i-Imtiaz (Medal of Distinction) Award by the President of Pakistan in 2018

See also 
 Sindh Institute of Urology & Transplantation

References

External links
Official website of Sindh Institute of Urology and Transplantation, (SIUT)

1938 births
Living people
Muhajir people
Pakistani transplant surgeons
Dow Medical College alumni
D. J. Sindh Government Science College alumni
Pakistani philanthropists
Recipients of Nishan-e-Imtiaz
Ramon Magsaysay Award winners
Dr A.T. Shousha Foundation Prize and Fellowship laureates